The Great Lakes are a collection of large lakes in eastern North America.

Great Lakes or Great Lake may also refer to:
Great Lakes region, the area near the Great Lakes in the United States and Canada

Lakes
African Great Lakes, a collection of lakes in and around the Great Rift Valley in eastern Africa
Great Lake (Tasmania), a lake in Australia
Perth Wetlands or Great Lakes District, in Perth, Western Australia
Tonlé Sap or Great Lake, a lake in Cambodia
Great Lake, a lake on the River Poulter in Nottinghamshire, UK

Fictional
The Great Lake, a minor place in Arda in J. R. R. Tolkien's Middle-earth

Military
Naval Station Great Lakes, a United States Navy base
USS Great Lakes, a planned destroyer tender of the United States Navy that was cancelled in 1946

Music
Great Lakes (band), a project of the Elephant Six Collective
The Great Lakes (album), an album by Emm Gryner

Transportation
Great Lakes Airlines, a United States regional airline based in Denver, Colorado
Great Lakes Aircraft Company, manufacturer of the 2T-1A Sport Trainer biplane
Great Lakes (Metra), a railway station in Lake Bluff, Illinois, United States

Other uses
Great Lakes Brewery (Toronto)
Great Lakes Brewing Company
Great Lakes Chemical Corporation, an American company, now part of Chemtura Corporation
Great Lakes Council, a former local government area in New South Wales, Australia
Great Lakes Higher Education Corporation, a lending body that specializes in educational loans
Great Lakes Institute of Management, based in Chennai, India
Great Lakes tectonic zone

See also
Great Lakes Commission, North American agency
Great Lakes Compact
Great Lakes Depression, a depression that contains the Great Lakes of Mongolia 
Great Lakes Megalopolis
Iowa Great Lakes, a collection of lakes in Dickinson County, Iowa, US